Ayşe Olcay Tiryaki (1955–2008) was a Turkish physician. Ayşe Olcay Tiryaki was a professor at the University of Ankara.

See also
List of Turkish physicians

External links
Page at the University of Ankara 

Turkish women physicians
Turkish physicians
1955 births
2008 deaths
Academic staff of Ankara University
20th-century Turkish physicians
21st-century Turkish physicians
20th-century women physicians
21st-century women physicians